Pivdenne is a city in Kharkiv Raion of Kharkiv Oblast (province) of Ukraine. It hosts the administration of Pivdenne urban hromada, one of the hromadas of Ukraine. Population:

References

Cities in Kharkiv Oblast
Kharkov Governorate
Cities of district significance in Ukraine